Adrianne Pieczonka, OC (born March 2, 1963) is a Canadian operatic soprano singer.

Life and career
Pieczonka was born in Poughkeepsie, New York, and grew up in Burlington, Ontario. She graduated from the University of Western Ontario in 1985, and from the Opera School of the University of Toronto in 1988. She made her professional stage debut with the Canadian Opera Company in 1988 singing The Female Prisoner in Shostakovich's Lady Macbeth of Mtensk. She moved to Europe in 1988 and quickly won first prize at the International Vocal Competition 's-Hertogenbosch in the Netherlands as well as First Prize at the International Singing Competition in La Plaine-sur-Mer, France, also in 1988.

She became a member of the Vienna Volksoper in 1989 where her roles included Countess Almaviva (The Marriage of Figaro), Donna Elvira (Don Giovanni), Laura (Der Bettelstudent) and Tatyana (Eugene Onegin). In 1991 she became a member of the Vienna State Opera where her roles included Desdemona (Otello), Antonia (The Tales of Hoffmann), Micaëla (Carmen), Die Tochter (Cardillac), Agathe (Der Freischütz), Countess Almaviva, Donna Elvira and Donna Anna (Don Giovanni), Ellen Orford (Peter Grimes), Eva (Die Meistersinger von Nürnberg), title role in Arabella, Ariadne in Ariadne auf Naxos, and The Marschallin (Der Rosenkavalier).

She moved to London, England in 1995, and made her British debut at Glyndebourne as Donna Elvira in Don Giovanni, returning there for Arabella in 1996. She made her debut at the Royal Opera House as Donna Anna in 2002.
Pieczonka moved back to Toronto, Canada in 2005 and performed regularly with the Canadian Opera Company. Her roles over many years have included Mimi (La bohème), Sieglinde (Die Walküre), Elisabetta (Don Carlo), Leonore (Fidelio), the title role in Tosca, and Amelia (Un ballo in maschera). She was awarded a Dora Award for her outstanding portrayal of Sieglinde in the 2004 production of Die Walküre.

She debuted at the Metropolitan Opera in 2004 as Lisa in Tchaikovsky's The Queen of Spades. At the MET she has also performed Sieglinde (Die Walküre), Amelia (Simon Boccanegra), Chrysothemis (Elektra), Leonore (Fidelio) and Madame Lidoine (Dialogues des Carmélites).

Pieczonka has performed with the world's leading opera companies for over three decades. Some of these include the Bavarian State Opera, Deutsche Oper Berlin, Berlin State Opera, Hamburg State Opera, Zurich Opera, Teatro Real, Liceu, Teatro Arriaga, Paris Opera, Grand Théâtre de Genève, Los Angeles Opera, Teatro Colón, San Francisco Opera, Houston Grand Opera, along with many others.
She made her Salzburg Festival debut in 2001 singing a concert version of Lohengrin and has since sung Elisabetta, The Marschallin and Leonore at this prestigious festival. She made her Bayreuth Festival debut in 2006, singing Sieglinde in Die Walküre and was hailed by Die Zeit as "The Sieglinde of our time" She returned to Bayreuth to sing Senta in The Flying Dutchman in 2012.
 
Pieczonka has worked with the world's finest conductors in concert and opera including Sir Georg Solti, Christian Thielemann, Claudio Abbado, Riccardo Muti, Zubin Mehta, Lorin Maazel, Pierre Boulez, James Levine, Semyon Bychkov, Kent Nagano, Sir Colin Davis, Daniel Barenboim, Donald Runnicles, Philippe Jordan, Yannick Nézet-Séguin, and Richard Bradshaw, among many others.

On the concert stage and as a recitalist, Pieczonka has performed at Toronto's Massey Hall and Roy Thomson Hall, the Edinburgh Festival, The Proms, Salle Pleyel in Paris, Vienna's Musikverein and Konzerthaus, Tokyo Bunka Kaikan, The Orpheum in Vancouver, Schubertiade in Schwarzenberg, Austria, Carnegie Hall and Avery Fisher Hall, New York, among many others.

In 2019 she was appointed the first Vocal Chair at the Glenn Gould School, where she gives regular masterclasses, and oversees the vocal department and their opera productions.

Awards and honours
Pieczonka's 2006 album Adrianne Pieczonka Sings Wagner and Strauss, on the Orfeo label, was nominated for Classical Album of the Year - Vocal or Choral Performance at the Juno Awards of 2007. Her next CD Adrianne Pieczonka sings Puccini won the category in the Juno Awards of 2010.

In March 2007, Pieczonka was invested as an Austrian Kammersängerin. She, along with tenor Michael Schade, are the first two Canadian singers to have had this honour. In 2008, she was made an Officer of the Order of Canada. In 2012, she was a recipient of the Queen Elizabeth II Diamond Jubilee Medal.

In 2014 she received the Paul de Hueck and Norman Walford Career Achievement Award from the Ontario Arts Foundation.
She has received Honorary Doctorates from McMaster University, Hamilton and from her alma mater, University of Western Ontario. 
She received a Ruby Award from Opera Canada in 2015.
She is a Honorary Fellow of the Royal Society of Canada as well as an Honorary Fellow of the Royal Conservatory of Music in Toronto.

Personal life
She resides in Toronto with her wife, mezzo-soprano Laura Tucker, their daughter Grace, and their two cats Sadie and Shadow.

Discography
 Adrianne Pieczonka sings Wagner & Strauss. Ulf Schirmer, Münchner Rundfunkorchester (2006, Orfeo)
 Adrianne Pieczonka sings Puccini. Dan Ettinger, Münchner Rundfunkorchester (2009, Orfeo)
 Adrianne Pieczonka sings Strauss, Wagner. Brian Zeger, piano (2015, Delos)
 Erich Wolfgang Korngold: Complete Songs (Sämtliche Lieder). Konrad Jarnot, Reinild Mees, piano (2015, Capriccio)

References

External links

A biography from Naxos
A biography from the CBC

1963 births
Living people
People from Burlington, Ontario
Musicians from Poughkeepsie, New York
Canadian people of Polish descent
Musicians from Ontario
Canadian operatic sopranos
University of Toronto alumni
University of Western Ontario alumni
Academic staff of The Royal Conservatory of Music
Canadian LGBT singers
Canadian lesbian musicians
Dora Mavor Moore Award winners
Juno Award for Classical Album of the Year – Vocal or Choral Performance winners
Officers of the Order of Canada
Österreichischer Kammersänger
Fellows of the Royal Society of Canada
Fellows of the Royal Conservatory of Music
20th-century Canadian women opera singers
21st-century Canadian women opera singers
20th-century Canadian LGBT people
21st-century Canadian LGBT people